Barfung Assembly constituency is one of the 32 assembly constituencies of Sikkim, a northeast state of India. Barfung is part of Sikkim Lok Sabha constituency.

This constituency is reserved for members of the Bhutia-Lepcha community.

Members of Legislative Assembly

Election results

2019

See also

 Barfung
 South Sikkim district
 List of constituencies of Sikkim Legislative Assembly

References

Assembly constituencies of Sikkim
Namchi district